April 2012

See also

References

 04
April 2012 events in the United States